May Company Building may refer to:

 May Company Building (Broadway, Los Angeles), on Broadway in Downtown Los Angeles
 May Company Building (Mission Valley, San Diego) at Westfield Mission Valley shopping center, San Diego
 May Company Building (Wilshire, Los Angeles), on the Miracle Mile in the Wilshire district, Los Angeles, renamed the Saban Building in 2017
 May Company Building (Cleveland, Ohio)